is a Japanese voice actress and narrator from Osaka. She voices characters from visual novels, and has been in the cast of five Key titles. She is also known under the name .

Filmography

Anime
 Clannad (2007) as Girl
 Little Busters! (2012) as Haruka Saigusa, Kanata Futaki
 Rewrite (2016–2017) as Shizuru Nakatsu
 Planetarian: The Reverie of a Little Planet (2016) as Yumemi Hoshino
 Nora, Princess, and Stray Cat (2017) as Narrator
 Kud Wafter (2021) as Haruka Saigusa, Kanata Futaki
 Kaginado (2021–2022) as Haruka Saigusa, Shizuru Nakatsu, Yumemi Hoshino

Video games
 Shinkyoku Sōkai Polyphonica (2006) as Eufinley Tsuge
 Iinazuke (2007) as Stinrorra Grana Mishal
 Tomoyo After: It's a Wonderful Life CS Edition (2007) as Takafumi Sakagami, Kanako
 Little Busters! (2007) as Haruka Saigusa
 Little Busters! Ecstasy (2008) as Haruka Saigusa, Kanata Futaki
 Flyable Heart (2009) as Shirasagi Mayuri
 Kud Wafter (2010) as Kanata Futaki
 Rewrite (2011) as Shizuru Nakatsu

References

External links
 Official blog 
 Official agency profile 
 

Year of birth missing (living people)
Living people
Voice actresses from Osaka Prefecture
Japanese voice actresses
Japanese video game actresses